Geranium holm-nielsenii is a species of plant in the family Geraniaceae. It is endemic to Ecuador. Its natural habitat is subtropical or tropical high-altitude grassland.

References

holm-nielsenii
Endemic flora of Ecuador
Vulnerable plants
Taxonomy articles created by Polbot
Plants described in 1996